Daniel Moussiaux (born 17 September 1945) is a Belgian field hockey player. He competed in the men's tournament at the 1964 Summer Olympics.

References

External links
 

1945 births
Living people
Belgian male field hockey players
Olympic field hockey players of Belgium
Field hockey players at the 1964 Summer Olympics
Place of birth missing (living people)